The Matrix is an American media franchise consisting of four feature films, beginning with The Matrix (1999) and continuing with three sequels, The Matrix Reloaded, The Matrix Revolutions (both 2003), and The Matrix Resurrections (2021). The first three films were written and directed by The Wachowskis and produced by Joel Silver. The screenplay for the fourth film was written by David Mitchell and Aleksandar Hemon, was directed by Lana Wachowski, and was produced by Grant Hill, James McTeigue, and Lana Wachowski. The franchise is owned by Warner Bros., which distributed the films along with Village Roadshow Pictures. The latter, along with Silver Pictures, are the two production companies that worked on the first three films.

The series features a cyberpunk story of the technological fall of humanity, in which the creation of artificial intelligence led the way to a race of powerful and self-aware machines that imprisoned mankind in a virtual reality system—the Matrix—to be farmed as a power source. Occasionally, some of the prisoners manage to break free from the system and, considered a threat, become pursued by the artificial intelligence both inside and outside of it. The films focus on the plight of Neo (Keanu Reeves), Trinity (Carrie-Anne Moss), and Morpheus (Laurence Fishburne and Yahya Abdul-Mateen II) trying to free humanity from the system while pursued by its guardians, such as Agent Smith (Hugo Weaving, Abdul-Mateen II, and Jonathan Groff). The story incorporates references to numerous norms particularly philosophical, religious, and spiritual ideas, among others the dilemma of choice vs. control, the brain in a vat thought experiment, messianism, and the concepts of inter-dependency and love. Influences include the principles of mythology, anime, and Hong Kong action films (particularly "heroic bloodshed" and martial arts movies). The film series is notable for its use of heavily choreographed action sequences and "bullet time" slow motion effects, which revolutionized action films to come.

The characters and setting of the films are further explored in other media set in the same fictional universe, including animation, comics, and video games. The comic "Bits and Pieces of Information" and The Animatrix short film "The Second Renaissance" act as prequels to the films, explaining how the franchise's setting came to be. The video game Enter the Matrix connects the story of the Animatrix short "Final Flight of the Osiris" with the events of Reloaded, while the online video game The Matrix Online was a direct sequel to Revolutions. These were typically written, commissioned, or approved by the Wachowskis.

The first film was an important critical and commercial success, winning four Academy Awards, introducing popular culture symbols such as the red pill and blue pill, and influencing action filmmaking. For those reasons, it has been added to the National Film Registry for preservation. Its first sequel was also a commercial success, becoming the highest-grossing R-rated film in history, until it was surpassed by Deadpool in 2016. As of 2006, the franchise has generated US$3 billion in revenue. A fourth film, The Matrix Resurrections, was released on December 22, 2021, with Lana Wachowski producing, co-writing and directing and Reeves and Moss reprising their roles.Setting

The series depicts a future in which Earth is dominated by a race of self-aware machines that was spawned from the creation of artificial intelligence early in the 21st century. At one point conflict arose between mankind and machines, and the machines rebelled against their creators. Mankind attempted to block out the machines' source of solar power by covering the sky in thick, stormy clouds. A massive war emerged between the two adversaries which ended with the machines victorious, capturing mankind. Having lost their definite source of energy, the machines devised a way to extract the human body's bioelectric and thermal energies by enclosing people in pods, while their minds are controlled by cybernetic implants connecting them to a simulated reality called The Matrix.

The virtual reality world simulated by the Matrix resembles human civilization around the turn of the 21st century (this time period was chosen because it is supposedly the pinnacle of human civilization). The environment inside the Matrix is practically indistinguishable from reality (although scenes set within the Matrix are presented on-screen with a green tint to the footage, and a general bias towards the color green), and the vast majority of humans connected to it are unaware of its true nature. Most of the central characters in the series are able to gain superhuman abilities within the Matrix by taking advantage of their understanding of its true nature to manipulate its virtual physical laws. The films take place both inside the Matrix and outside of it, in the real world; the parts that take place in the Matrix are set in a vast Western megacity.

The virtual world is first introduced in The Matrix. The short comic "Bits and Pieces of Information" and the Animatrix short film The Second Renaissance show how the initial conflict between mankind and machines came about, and how and why the Matrix was first developed. Its history and purpose are further explained in The Matrix Reloaded. In The Matrix Revolutions a new status quo is established in the Matrix's place in mankind and machines' conflict. This was further explored in The Matrix Online, a now-defunct MMORPG.

Films

 Future 
During production of the original trilogy, the Wachowskis told their close collaborators that, "at that time they had no intention of making another Matrix film after The Matrix Revolutions". In February 2015, in promotion interviews for Jupiter Ascending, Lilly Wachowski called a return to The Matrix "a particularly repelling idea in these times", noting studios' tendencies to "greenlight" sequels, reboots, and adaptations, in preference to original material. Meanwhile, Lana Wachowski, in addressing rumors about a potential reboot, stated that "...they had not heard anything, but she believed that the studio might be looking to replace them". At various times, Keanu Reeves and Hugo Weaving each confirmed their interest and willingness to reprise their roles in potential future installments of the Matrix films, with the stipulation that the Wachowskis were involved in the creative and production process. These comments were made prior to the announcement in August 2019 that Lana Wachowski would direct a fourth Matrix film ultimately titled The Matrix Resurrections.

Following the release of Resurrections, producer James McTeigue said that there were no plans for further Matrix films, though he believed that the film's open ending meant that could change in the future.

Other projects
In March 2017, The Hollywood Reporter wrote that Warner Bros. was in the early stages of developing a re-launch of the franchise. Consideration was given to producing a Matrix television series, but was dismissed as the studio opted to pursue negotiations with Zak Penn in writing a treatment for a new film, with Michael B. Jordan eyed for the lead role. According to the article, the Wachowskis were not involved at that point. In response to the report, Penn refuted all statements regarding a reboot, remake, or continuation, remarking that he was working on stories set in the pre-established continuity.

Potential plotlines being considered by Warner Bros. Pictures included a prequel film about a young Morpheus, or an alternate storyline with a focus on one of his descendants. By April 2018, Penn described the script as "being at a nascent stage". Later, in September 2019, Jordan addressed the rumors of his involvement by saying he was "flattered", but without making a definitive statement. In October 2019, Penn confirmed the script he wrote is set within an earlier time period than the first three films in the franchise.

Cast and crew
Cast

Crew
The following is a list of crew members who have participated in the making of the Matrix film series.

Production

The Matrix series includes four feature films. The first three were written and directed by the Wachowskis and produced by Joel Silver, starring Keanu Reeves, Laurence Fishburne, Carrie-Anne Moss and Hugo Weaving. The series was filmed in Australia and began with 1999's The Matrix, which depicts the recruitment of hacker Neo into humanity's rebellion against sentient machines.

The film's mainstream success had backed up the initial idea of making a trilogy. The sequels, The Matrix Reloaded and The Matrix Revolutions, were filmed simultaneously during one shoot (under the project codename "The Burly Man"), and released in two parts in 2003. They tell the story of the impending attack on the human enclave of Zion by a vast machine army. Neo also learns more about the history of the Matrix and his role as The One. The sequels also incorporate more ambitious action scenes and visual effects.

Reception

Box office performanceThe Matrix was highly successful, earning over $460 million worldwide on a modest budget of $63 million. The sequels had a much larger budget of $150 million each; Reloaded was also a big commercial success, earning almost $742 million worldwide and becoming the highest-grossing R-rated film in history, a title which it held for 13 years until it was surpassed by the film Deadpool; Revolutions had the world's first simultaneous release across major cities all over the world, which for the first time in history included both a release in China, and a release in IMAX theaters. Its five-day opening at $204 million broke the previous record, but ultimately the film made $427 million, a little less than the original.

Critical and public responseThe Matrix and The Matrix Reloaded received positive reviews, the critical response to The Matrix Revolutions was more negative. One complaint was that Revolutions did not give answers to the questions raised in Reloaded.

Accolades

Legal claims
In April 2003, Sophia Stewart filed a legal complaint in the United States District Court for the Central District of California alleging that the idea of The Matrix (and the 1984 film The Terminator) were plagiarized from her own film treatment titled "The Third Eye". The court allowed the lawsuit to move forward in 2005, but Stewart did not attend the deposition. In a 53-page ruling, Judge Margaret Morrow dismissed the case, stating that Stewart and her attorneys "had not entered any evidence to bolster its key claims or demonstrated any striking similarity between her work and the accused directors' films." In August 2014, Stewart successfully sued her lawyers because they "failed to provide legal services to Ms. Stewart in the California case, and thereby breached the Contract. For example, [her lawyers] failed timely to respond to discovery requests or serve discovery requests on the California defendants, failed to depose key witnesses or develop admissible evidence, failed to deny requests for admission, and failed to respond timely to the California defendants’ motion for summary judgment." "Ms. Stewart did not appear for [the 2005] deposition, ultimately twice failing to appear for her deposition; and both times unknowingly, as her attorneys never advised her of the depositions." Stewart was awarded damages totaling $316,280.62. Despite the ruling, the case became the subject of "Internet legend", with many sources claiming Stewart had actually won the lawsuit.

In 2013, Thomas Althouse filed suit in California federal court alleging that ideas for the sequels The Matrix Reloaded and The Matrix Revolutions came from a screenplay he wrote called The Immortals. In a summary judgement for the defendants, Judge R. Gary Klausner stated "The basic premises of The Matrix Trilogy and The Immortals are so different that it would be unreasonable to find their plots substantially similar."

Influences and interpretations

The Matrix films make numerous references to films and literature, and to historical myths and philosophy, including Buddhism, Vedanta, Advaita Hinduism, Christianity, Messianism, Judaism, Gnosticism, existentialism, obscurantism, and nihilism. The films' premise resembles Plato's Allegory of the cave, René Descartes's evil demon, Kant's reflections on the Phenomenon versus the Ding an sich, Zhuangzi's "Zhuangzi dreamed he was a butterfly", Marxist social theory and the brain in a vat thought experiment. Many references to Jean Baudrillard's 1981 treatise Simulacra and Simulation appear in the first film. Baudrillard himself considered this a misrepresentation, although Lana Wachowski claims the point the reference was making was misunderstood. There are similarities to cyberpunk works such as the 1984 book Neuromancer by William Gibson, who has described The Matrix as "arguably the ultimate 'cyberpunk' artifact".

Japanese director Mamoru Oshii's 1995 film Ghost in the Shell was a strong influence. Producer Joel Silver has stated that the Wachowskis first described their intentions for The Matrix by showing him that anime and saying, "We wanna do that for real."Joel Silver, interviewed in "Making The Matrix" featurette on the Matrix DVD. Mitsuhisa Ishikawa of Production I.G, which produced Ghost in the Shell, noted that the anime's high-quality visuals were a strong source of inspiration for the Wachowskis. He also commented, "... cyberpunk films are very difficult to describe to a third person. I'd imagine that The Matrix is the kind of film that was very difficult to draw up a written proposal for to take to film studios." He stated that since Ghost in the Shell had gained recognition in America, the Wachowskis used it as a "promotional tool". Similarities to the 1985 anime film Megazone 23 have also been noticed, but the Wachowskis stated they have never seen it.

Reviewers have commented on similarities between The Matrix and other late-1990s films such as Strange Days, Dark City, and The Truman Show. The Wachowskis stated Dark City had no influence on the franchise, but commented about it and The Truman Show that they thought it was "very strange that Australia came to have three films associated with it that were all about the nature of reality." Comparisons have also been made to Grant Morrison's comic series The Invisibles; Morrison believes that the Wachowskis essentially plagiarized their work to create the film. The Wachowskis responded that they enjoy the comic, but did not use it for inspiration. In addition, the similarity of the films' central concept to a device in the long-running series Doctor Who has also been noted. As in the film, the Matrix of that series (introduced in the 1976 serial The Deadly Assassin) is a massive computer system which one enters using a device connecting to the head, allowing users to see representations of the real world and change its laws of physics; but if killed there, they will die in reality.

The first Matrix film features numerous references to the "White Rabbit", the "Rabbit Hole" and mirrors, referring to Lewis Carroll's novels Alice's Adventures in Wonderland (1865) and Through the Looking-Glass (1871). Matrixism is a new religious movement inspired by the trilogy. Adam Possamai, a sociologist of religion, describes these types of religions/spiritualities as hyper-real religions due to their eclectic mix of religion/spirituality with elements of popular culture and their connection to the fluid social structures of late capitalism. There is some debate about whether followers of Matrixism are indeed serious about their practice; however, the religion (real or otherwise) has received attention in the media.

Following the Wachowskis' coming out as transgender women some years after the release of the films, the first film and the pill analogy have also been analyzed in the context of the Wachowskis' transgender experiences. In this case, taking the red pill and living out of the Matrix symbolizes exploring one's own gender identity, starting the transition and coming out as transgender, as opposed to a continued life in the closet. In 2016, Lilly Wachowski acknowledged this analysis by calling it "a cool thing because it's an excellent reminder that art is never static".

 Home media 
In 2004, Warner Home Video released The Ultimate Matrix Collection, a 10-disc set of the films on DVD. It included the trilogy of films, The Animatrix, and six discs of additional material, including the documentary film The Matrix Revisited, the live-action footage shot for Enter the Matrix, and a promotional compilation of The Matrix Online. For this release, The Matrix was remastered under the supervision of the Wachowskis and the trilogy's cinematographer, Bill Pope, to improve its picture quality and make its color timing closer to that of its sequels. At the request of the Wachowskis, as they explain in a written statement that accompanies the boxset, each of the three films is accompanied by two audio commentaries, one by philosophers who liked the films, and another by critics who did not, with the intention that viewers use them as reference points to form their own opinion. The compilation includes 35 hours of bonus material, but some of the extras from earlier, standalone, releases are missing. A Limited Edition of The Ultimate Matrix Collection was also released. It encases the ten discs plus a resin bust of Neo inside an acrylic glass box.The Ultimate Matrix Collection was later also released on HD DVD (5 discs) and Blu-ray (6 discs) in 2007 and 2008, respectively. The HD DVD release added a picture-in-picture video commentary to the three films and the extras that were missing from the previous DVD compilation. The Blu-ray release presented The Animatrix in high definition for the first time. A pared-down set dubbed The Complete Matrix Trilogy was also released on HD DVD and Blu-ray (3 discs each), which dropped The Animatrix and some of the special features.

The Ultra HD Blu-ray release of The Matrix Trilogy came out in 2018 (9 discs), and presented the trilogy in 4K resolution and high-dynamic-range video, remastered from the original camera negative and supervised by Bill Pope. In this release, The Matrix is presented with a color grade that reportedly comes closer to its theatrical presentation than any of the previous home video releases. The set also includes standard Blu-ray copies of the films sourced from the new 4K master, but is missing The Animatrix and some special features.

Other media and merchandising
By August 2000, The Matrix DVD had sold over three million copies in United States, becoming the best-selling of all time. As of 2006, the franchise has grossed  from all sources worldwide.

Animation

In acknowledgment of the strong influence of Japanese Anime on the Matrix series, The Animatrix was produced in 2003 to coincide with the release of The Matrix Reloaded. This is a collection of nine animated short films intended to further flesh out the concepts, history, characters, and setting of the series. The objective of The Animatrix project was to give other writers and directors the opportunity to lend their voices and interpretation to the Matrix universe; the Wachowskis conceived of and oversaw the process, and they wrote four of the segments themselves, although they were given to other directors to execute. Many of the segments were produced by notable figures from the world of Japanese animation. Four of the films were originally released on the series' official website, one was shown in cinemas with Dreamcatcher, one was shown on MTV, MTV2, MTV3, MTV4, and Syfi, and the others first appeared with the DVD release of all nine shorts shortly after the release of The Matrix Reloaded.

Video games
On May 15, 2003, the game Enter the Matrix was released in North America concurrently with The Matrix Reloaded. The first of three video games related to the films, it told a story running parallel to The Matrix Reloaded and featured scenes that were shot during the filming of The Matrix Reloaded and The Matrix Revolutions.

Two more The Matrix video games were released in 2005. The MMORPG The Matrix Online continued the story beyond The Matrix Revolutions, while The Matrix: Path of Neo allowed players to control Neo in scenes from the film trilogy. The Matrix Online was shut down in 2009.

The Matrix official website also provided several original Adobe Flash-based browser games.

An interactive technology demonstration, titled The Matrix Awakens, was released on December 9, 2021.

Comic booksThe Matrix Comics is a set of comics and short stories based on the series and written and illustrated by figures from the comics industry; one of the comics was written by the Wachowskis and illustrated by the films' concept artist Geof Darrow. The comics and stories were originally presented for free on the Matrix series' website between 1999 and 2003. One of them was printed in 1999 to be given away at theaters as a promotional item for The Matrix, but Warner Bros. recalled it due to its mature content. Most of them were later republished by the Wachowskis' Burlyman Entertainment, along with some new stories and updates with color to some of the existing ones, in two printed trade paperback volumes in 2003 and 2004 and a deluxe hardcover twentieth-anniversary edition in 2019.

Screensaver
The Matrix official website provided a free screensaver for Microsoft Windows and Mac OS X, which simulates the falling "Matrix digital rain" of the films. The screensaver was reported to have a password security problem. The "Matrix digital rain" also inspired the creation of many unofficial screensavers.

Books
Official
 The Art of the Matrix by various (Newmarket Press, 2000) 
 The Matrix Shooting Script by the Wachowskis (with introduction by William Gibson) (Newmarket Press, 2001) 
 The Matrix Comics, Vol. 1 by various (Burlyman Entertainment, 2003) 
 The Matrix Comics, Vol. 2 by various (Burlyman Entertainment, 2004) 
 Enter the Matrix: Official Strategy Guide by Doug Walsh (BradyGames, 2003) 
 The Matrix Online: Prima Official Game Guide (Prima Games, 2005) 
 The Matrix: Path of Neo: Official Strategy Guide (BradyGames, 2005) 
 The Matrix Comics: 20th Anniversary Edition by various (Burlyman Entertainment, 2019) 

Unofficial
 Jacking In to the Matrix Franchise: Cultural Reception and Interpretation by Matthew Kapell and William G. Doty (Continuum International, 2004) 
 Taking the Red Pill: Science, Philosophy and Religion in "The Matrix" by Glenn Yeffeth (Summersdale, 2003) 
 Matrix Warrior: Being the One by Jake Horsley (Gollancz, 2003) 
 The "Matrix" and Philosophy: Welcome to the Desert of the Real by William Irwin (Open Court, 2002) 
 More Matrix and Philosophy by William Irwin (Open Court, 2005) 
 Like a Splinter in Your Mind: The Philosophy Behind the "Matrix" Trilogy by Matt Lawrence (Blackwell, 2004) 
 The Matrix (British Film Institute, 2004) 
 Matrix Revelations: A Thinking Fan's Guide to the Matrix Trilogy by Steve Couch (Damaris, 2003) 
 Beyond the Matrix: Revolutions and Revelations by Stephen Faller (Chalice Press, 2004) 
 The "Matrix" Trilogy: Cyberpunk Reloaded by Stacy Gillis (Wallflower Press, 2005) 
 Exegesis of the Matrix by Peter B. Lloyd (Whole-Being Books, 2003) 
 The Gospel Reloaded by Chris Seay and Greg Garrett (Pinon Press, 2003) 
 The "Matrix": What Does the Bible Say About... by D. Archer (Scripture Union, 2001) 
 [Journey to the Source: Decoding Matrix Trilogy] by Pradheep Challiyil (Sakthi Books 2004) 
 Exploring the Matrix: Visions of the Cyber Present by Karen Haber (St. Martin's Press, 2003) 
 Philosophers Explore The Matrix by Christopher Gray (Oxford University Press, 2005) 
 The Matrix Cultural Revolution by Michel Marriott (Thunder's Mouth Press, 2003) 
 The Matrix Reflections: Choosing between reality and illusion by Eddie Zacapa (Authorhouse, 2005) 
 The One by A.J. Yager & Dean Vescera (Lifeforce Publishing, 2003) 
 Matrix og ulydighedens evangelium (Danish for: "Matrix and the Evangelium of disobedients") by Rune Engelbreth Larsen (Bindslev, 2004) 
 The Third Eye: Where It All Begins by Sophia Stewart (All Eyes on Me, 2006) 
 The Matrix 4 – The Evolution of Consciousness: Cracking the Genetic Code by Sophia Stewart (All Eyes on Me, 2010) 
 The Matrix and the Alice Books by Voicu Mihnea Simandan (Lulu Books, 2010) 

See also

 Simulated reality in fiction
 Religion and the Internet
 The Meatrix'', 2003 parody

Notes

References

Further reading

External links

 
 
 

 
Action film franchises
American film series
Martial arts science fiction films
Religion in science fiction
Science fiction film franchises
Simulated reality in fiction
Warner Bros. Pictures franchises
Film series introduced in 1999
Dystopian fiction
Fiction about consciousness transfer
Apocalyptic fiction
Post-apocalyptic fiction
Artificial intelligence in fiction
Malware in fiction
Fiction about memory erasure and alteration
Cybernetted society in fiction
Brain–computer interfacing in fiction